Pierre Claude François Daunou (18 August 176120 June 1840) was a French statesman of the French Revolution and Empire. An author and historian, he served as the nation's archivist under both the Empire and the Restoration, contributed a volume to the Histoire littéraire de la France, and published more than twenty volumes of lectures he delivered when he held the chair of history and ethics at the Collège de France.

Early career 
He was born at Boulogne-sur-Mer. After studying at the school the Oratorians operates there, he joined the order in Paris in 1777. He was professor in various seminaries from 1780 to 1787, when he was ordained a priest. He had by then published essays and poems that established his reputation in literary circles.

With the onset of the French Revolution, he supported the Civil Constitution of the Clergy; a proffered appointment to a high Catholic Church office failed to induce him to alter his position.

Elected to the National Convention by the Pas-de-Calais département, he associated himself with the moderate Girondists and strongly opposed the death sentence imposed on King Louis XVI. Daunou took little part in the Girondist clash with their radical opponents, The Mountain, but was involved in the events of his party's overthrow in the summer of 1793 and was imprisoned for almost a year.

Directory 
In December 1794 he returned to the convention and was the principal author of the Constitution of the Year III that established the Directory in November 1795. It is probably because of his Girondinism that the Council of the Ancients was given the right of convoking the Council of Five Hundred outside Paris, an expedient which made possible Napoleon Bonaparte's coup d'état (the 18 Brumaire) in 1799.

Daunou was also drew up the plans for the erection and organization of the Institut de France. He was instrumental in crushing the Royalist insurgency known as the 13 Vendémiaire. He was elected by twenty-seven départements as member of the Council of Five Hundred and became its first president. He was ineligible for election as a director, having himself set the age qualification for that office at forty when he was thirty-four. When the government passed into the hands of Talleyrand and his associates, Daunou returned briefly to literature, but in 1798 he was sent to Rome to organize the Roman Republic.

 Napoleon and Restoration 
In 1799 Daunou returned the role of statesman, preparing the Constitution of the Year VIII, which established the Consulate, under which Napoleon held the position of First Consul. He remained largely ambivalent towards Napoleon, but supported him against Pope Pius VII and the Papal States, providing him historical arguments in a scholarly treatise Sur la puissance temporelle du Pape (On the Temporal Power of the Papacy) in 1809.

Nonetheless, he took little part in the new regime, of which he was resentful, and turned more and more to literature. At the Restoration in 1814, he was deprived of the post of archivist of the Empire, which he had held since 1807. In 1819 he became the chair of history and ethics at the Collège de France; in that role, his courses were among the most famous of the period. With the advent of the July Monarchy in 1830, he regained his old post, now under the title archivist of the Kingdom. In 1839, Daunou was made a peer.

 Legacy 

The Encyclopædia Britannica Eleventh Edition'' writes:

See also

Society of the Friends of Truth

References

Additional sources

External links

 
 Pierre Claude François Daunou pamphlets and works from the Ball State University Digital Media Repository

1761 births
1840 deaths
People from Boulogne-sur-Mer
Politicians from Hauts-de-France
Girondins
Orléanists
Deputies to the French National Convention
Presidents of the National Convention
Members of the Council of Five Hundred
Members of the Chamber of Deputies of the Bourbon Restoration
Members of the 1st Chamber of Deputies of the July Monarchy
Members of the 2nd Chamber of Deputies of the July Monarchy
Members of the Chamber of Peers of the July Monarchy
First French Empire
French archivists
French classical liberals
French essayists
19th-century French historians
French male essayists
18th-century French Roman Catholic priests
19th-century French Roman Catholic priests
Academic staff of the Collège de France
Members of the Académie des sciences morales et politiques
Members of the Académie des Inscriptions et Belles-Lettres
Burials at Père Lachaise Cemetery